Mosaraf Hussen is an Indian politician from the state of West Bengal. Hussen is a member of the West Bengal Legislative Assembly
and represents the Itahar (Vidhan Sabha constituency).

References

Living people
Trinamool Congress politicians from West Bengal
Year of birth missing (living people)